Yeb may refer to:

 The Nile island of Elephantine, referred to in the Elephantine papyri and the site of a Jewish temple in the 4th and 5th centuries BCE.
 Yorkshire Electricity of England.